Cristian Brocchi (born 30 January 1976) is an Italian professional football manager and former player who was most recently the head coach of Vicenza.

As a defensive midfielder, Brocchi was rated for his durability and tackling. He began his career with hometown club AC Milan, but he struggled to break into the first team as a youngster. He was subsequently loaned to Pro Sesto and Lumezzane, before being sold to Hellas Verona in 1998. His performances for the club earned him a move to Inter Milan in 2000, where he also struggled due to injury. He returned to Milan in 2001, and went on to represent the club for the next seven seasons, aside from a season on loan with Fiorentina, during a highly successful period for the club, which saw him win the Serie A and two UEFA Champions League titles, among other trophies. He ended his career in 2013, after five seasons with Lazio, where he won the Coppa Italia twice. At international level, he made his only appearance for the Italy national team in 2006.

Brocchi began his senior managerial career at Milan in April 2016, after having been their youth team's head coach since 2014. After only one month, he was sacked, and was then appointed head coach of Brescia in the Serie B. Following a season as assistant coach of Chinese club Jiangsu Suning, in 2018 Brocchi became head coach of Serie C side Monza, helping them gain promotion to the Serie C for the first time in 19 years. He was dismissed in 2021, after failing promotion to the Serie A.

Club career

Early career
Starting his career at AC Milan's youth system, Brocchi was loaned to Pro Sesto and Lumezzane in the early years. After struggling to find space in the first team, Brocchi was sold to Serie B side Hellas Verona  in 1998. He helped the club obtain promotion to Serie A.

Inter Milan 
After a year in the top-division, Inter Milan coach Marcello Lippi signed Brocchi in 2000. However, Brocchi and Inter endured a difficult season, as Lippi was sacked after their opening Serie A match, a defeat to Reggina. Marco Tardelli was hired as Lippi's replacement, and he guided the Nerazzurri to a fifth-place finish in Serie A. The following season, new Inter manager Héctor Cúper decided to sell Brocchi. Brocchi later described his time at Inter "as the worst experience [he] ever had", citing the lack of support from the club while injured.

AC Milan (second spell)
In July 2001, Milan re-signed him in exchange for Andrés Guglielminpietro, who joined Inter. While at Milan, Brocchi had to compete with the likes of Fernando Redondo, Gennaro Gattuso, Andrea Pirlo, Massimo Ambrosini, and later Clarence Seedorf.

Fiorentina
Brocchi was loaned to Fiorentina in July 2005, with a view to a permanent deal at the end of the season. However, at the end of 2005–06, he returned to Milan, partly as a result of the problems Milan faced in finding new recruits due to the 2006 Italian football scandal.

AC Milan (third spell)
Brocchi made a career high 29 Serie A appearances in the 2006–07 season. Although Emerson arrived in the 2007–08, Brocchi continued to appear regularly making 24 appearances, 10 as starter, effectively becoming manager Carlo Ancelotti's first choice replacement in midfield.

Lazio
Milan and Lazio reached an agreement for a permanent transfer for Brocchi on 29 August 2008. He signed a three-year deal with Lazio and just cost Lazio a nominal transfer fee. His first season was successful as he won the Coppa Italia, Lazio's fifth Coppa Italia title.

Following the 2012–13 season, Brocchi and Lazio announced his retirement due to on-going injury problems.

International career
Brocchi made his international debut and only appearance for the Italy national team under Roberto Donadoni, in a 1–1 friendly home draw against Turkey, on 15 November 2006.

Managerial career

Early career 
On 12 April 2016, Brocchi was appointed the head coach of Milan for his first senior managerial position, after previously serving as the coach of the AC Milan youth team, replacing Siniša Mihajlović after his sacking. On 28 June 2016, Brocchi was replaced by Vincenzo Montella.

Brocchi served as head coach of Serie B club Brescia during the 2016–17 season, being removed from his managerial duties on 12 March 2017 due to poor results. He worked as Fabio Capello's assistant at Jiangsu Suning during the 2017 Chinese Super League.

Monza 
In October 2018, Brocchi was named new head coach of Serie C club Monza, under the ownership of the former Milan duo of Silvio Berlusconi and Adriano Galliani. After failing promotion on play-offs on his first season in charge, he successfully guided Monza to win the 2019–20 Serie C title and was therefore confirmed for a third season at the helm of the club, with the explicit goal to bring the Brianzoli to Serie A for the first time in their history.

In the 2020–21 Serie B season, Monza narrowly missed out on automatic promotion, finishing third, and was subsequently eliminated by sixth-placed Cittadella in the play-off semifinals. Following these results, Brocchi left Monza by mutual consent on 28 May 2021.

Vicenza 
On 22 September, Brocchi was named as the new coach of Vicenza. Taking over with Vicenza in deep relegation trouble, he however failed to turn around the club's fortunes, and was dismissed on 11 April 2022.

Personal life
Outside of football, Brocchi opened a cafe in Milan along with former Milan teammate Christian Abbiati, and started his own clothing brand (Baci & Abbracci) with close friend and footballer Christian Vieri and model Alena Šeredová.

Career statistics

Club

Managerial

Honours

Player 
Milan
Serie A: 2003–04
Coppa Italia: 2002–03
Supercoppa Italiana: 2004
UEFA Champions League: 2002–03, 2006–07
UEFA Super Cup: 2007
FIFA Club World Cup: 2007

Lazio
Coppa Italia: 2008–09, 2012–13
Supercoppa Italiana: 2009

Manager 
Monza
 Serie C Group A: 2019–20

References

External links

https://web.archive.org/web/20060509150619/http://www.cristianbrocchi.it/
Brocchi and Vieri's clothing line
Profile and stats. at Inter Archive
Profile and stats. at ACmilan.com 
Profile and stats. at Fiorentina official site 
uefa.com short bios.
stats. at Voetbal International 

1976 births
Living people
Footballers from Milan
A.C. Milan players
S.S.D. Pro Sesto players
ACF Fiorentina players
Serie A players
Serie B players
Serie C players
Association football midfielders
Inter Milan players
Italian footballers
Italy international footballers
Hellas Verona F.C. players
S.S. Lazio players
F.C. Lumezzane V.G.Z. A.S.D. players
Italian football managers
Serie A managers
Serie C managers
A.C. Milan managers
Brescia Calcio managers
A.C. Monza managers
L.R. Vicenza managers
UEFA Champions League winning players